Margaret Ives Abbott (June 15, 1878 – June 10, 1955) was an American amateur golfer. She was the first American woman to win an Olympic event: the women's golf tournament at the 1900 Summer Olympics.

Born in Calcutta (now Kolkata), India, in 1878, Abbott moved with her family to Chicago in 1884. She joined the Chicago Golf Club in Wheaton, Illinois, where she was coached by Charles B. Macdonald and H. J. Whigham. In 1899, she traveled with her mother to Paris to study art. In October 1900, along with her mother, she signed up for a women's golf tournament without realizing that it was the second modern Olympics. Abbott won the tournament with a score of 47 strokes; her mother tied for seventh place. Abbott received a porcelain bowl as a prize.

In December 1902, she married the writer Finley Peter Dunne. They later moved to New York and had four children. Abbott died at the age of 76 in 1955, never realizing that she won an Olympic event. She was not well known until Paula Welch, a professor at the University of Florida, researched her life. In 2018, The New York Times published her belated obituary.

Life and career

Early life 
Margaret Ives Abbott was born on June 15, 1878, in Calcutta (now Kolkata), India, to Charles and Mary Ives Abbott. Her father was a wealthy American merchant who died in 1879. Margaret, along with her mother and her siblings, moved to Boston. During her teenage years, her mother became literary editor of the Chicago Herald and the family moved to Chicago in 1884.

In the late nineteenth century, women were restricted from competing in various sports. Golf clubs allowed women to play only if they were accompanied by a man. Abbott, along with her mother, began playing golf at the Chicago Golf Club in Wheaton, a suburb of Chicago. She was coached by amateur golfers Charles B. Macdonald and H. J. Whigham. Abbott and Macdonald partnered in an 1897 tournament at Washington Park. She won several local tournaments, and by 1899, she had a two handicap. She was referred to as a "fierce competitor", and was known to have a "classy backswing". That same year, she and her mother traveled to Paris. Her mother researched and wrote a travel guide A Woman's Paris: A Handbook of Every-day Living in the French Capital (1900); Margaret studied art alongside Auguste Rodin and Edgar Degas.

Paris Olympics 

The 1900 Summer Olympics, hosted in Paris between May and October, was the second modern Olympics. Pierre de Coubertin, the founder of the Olympics, initially planned the games for only men. In 1900, however, women were allowed to compete in five sports: golf, tennis, sailing, rowing, and equestrianism. Out of a total of 997 athletes, 22 were women. The events lacked proper equipment, did not have an opening or closing ceremony, and included sports like tug of war, kite flying, hot air ballooning, and pigeon racing. Two golf events were scheduled—one for men and one for women.

The Olympics coincided with the 1900 Paris Exposition, and many believed that it was overshadowed by the latter. Golf Illustrated referred to the event as the competition "in connection with the Paris Exhibition". The event was called the "Exposition Competition" or "Paris World's Fair Competition" instead of being referred to as an Olympic event. Olympics historian Bill Mallon later said: "A lot of the events in 1900 were considered demonstration sports. It's very hard to tell what was an Olympics sport and what was not." According to Mallon, many athletes did not know that they were participating in the Olympics.

Abbott learned about the tournament from a newspaper notice. Taking a break from her studies, she decided to sign up for the event. She won with a score of 47 strokes. Pauline Whittier was the runner-up, with 49 strokes. Mary Abbott also participated in the event and tied for seventh place with a score of 65. All ten competitors played in long skirts and hats. According to Abbott, she won "because all the French girls apparently misunderstood the nature of the game scheduled that day and turned up to play in high heels and tight skirts". She was awarded a porcelain bowl embellished with gold. Although a few other Olympics tournaments had silver and bronze medals, no gold medals were awarded for the golf event. Her victory was reported in the Chicago Tribune.

Later life 

Abbott stayed in Paris and won a French championship before returning to America in 1901. She married the writer Finley Peter Dunne on December 9, 1902. According to the Chicago Tribune, although the wedding ceremony "was celebrated as quietly and with as little display as possible", they received telegrams from "dozens of ... literary lights", including Sir Arthur Conan Doyle. The couple later settled in New York City. They had four children, including Philip Dunne. Abbott did not compete in many tournaments due to a knee injury caused by a childhood accident. Records of Abbott's ties to the Chicago Golf Club were destroyed in the 1912 clubhouse fire. Abbott died at the age of 76 on June 10, 1955, in Greenwich, Connecticut.

Legacy 
Abbott never realized that she participated in and became the first American woman to win an Olympic event. She was not well known until Paula Welch, a professor at the University of Florida and a member of the Olympics Board of Directors, researched her life during the 1970s when she first saw Abbott mentioned as an Olympic champion in 1973. Welch spent a decade examining newspaper articles that mentioned Abbott's successes in various golfing competitions. In the mid-1980s, she contacted Philip, Abbott's son, informing him about his mother's Olympic victory. Analyzing the reasons for her obscurity, Welch said: "We didn't have the coverage that we have today .... She came back. She got married. She raised her family. She played some golf, but she didn't really pursue it in tournaments."

Writing for Golf Digest in 1984, Philip wrote: "It's not every day that you learn your mother was an Olympic champion, 80-odd years after the fact. The champion herself had told us only that she had won the golf championship of Paris." In 1996, Abbott was the featured athlete of the 1900 Olympics in the official Olympics program of the Atlanta games. After 1904, golf was not included in the Olympic Games until the 2016 Summer Olympics. In 2018, The New York Times published her belated obituary.

References

Works cited

Online sources

Print sources

External links

 

American female golfers
Amateur golfers
Golfers at the 1900 Summer Olympics
Olympic gold medalists for the United States in golf
Medalists at the 1900 Summer Olympics
Sportswomen from Kolkata
American expatriates in British India
1878 births
1955 deaths